The Daily Monitor is a Ugandan independent daily newspaper. Its name is shared by the Saturday Monitor and Sunday Monitor, which are also published by Monitor Publications Limited. Daily Monitor averaged a daily circulation of 24,230 newspapers in September 2011. By the fourth quarter of 2019, that figure had dropped to 16,169 copies daily.

Location
The headquarters of the Daily Monitor and the Daily Monitor Publications, as well as the printing press of the newspaper, are located at 29-35 8th Street (Namuwongo Road) in the Industrial Area of Kampala, Uganda's capital and largest city.

Overview
The newspaper was established in 1992 as The Monitor, and relaunched as the Daily Monitor in June 2005. The paper asserts that its private ownership guarantees the independence of its editors and journalists.

The newspaper headquarters are housed in the same building that houses the other investments owned by Monitor Publications Limited, including Daily Monitor newspaper, Monitor Business Directory, Ennyanda sports newspaper (in Luganda), 90.4 Dembe FM radio station (in Luganda and English), 93.3 KFM radio station, Daily Monitor e-paper, The Monitor E-paper app, and Daily Monitor social media channels.

Monitor Publications Limited and all its subsidiaries listed above are owned by Nation Media Group, a media conglomerate, based in Nairobi, Kenya and whose shares are listed on the Nairobi Stock Exchange and are crosslisted on the Uganda Securities Exchange, the Dar es Salaam Stock Exchange, and the Rwanda Stock Exchange.

2013 police raid

The premises of the Daily Monitor were raided by Uganda police on 20 May 2013. This happened soon after the paper had published a letter allegedly written by army General David Sejusa, threatening that those opposing Muhoozi Kainerugaba for the presidency risked their lives. Kainerugaba is the son of the long-standing president Yoweri Museveni. The same letter was also published by another Ugandan newspaper, Red Pepper, whose offices were also raided.

The police siege ended on 30 May 2013, and the newspaper and its radio stations 90.4 Dembe FM and 93.3 KFM Uganda, which had been switched off during the siege, were reopened.

See also
 List of newspapers in Uganda
 Media in Uganda

References

External links
 
 25 years ago, The Monitor was born. Drama was unfolding in Uganda

Daily newspapers published in Uganda
Nation Media Group
Publications established in 1992
1992 establishments in Uganda
Mass media in Kampala